In quantum gravity, the Hawking–Page phase transition is phase transition between AdS black holes with radiation and thermal AdS.

Hawking and Page showed that although AdS black holes can be in stable thermal equilibrium with radiation, they are not the preferred state below a certain critical temperature . At this temperature, there will be a first order phase transition where below , thermal AdS will become the dominant contribution to the partition function.

References

Black holes
Quantum gravity